Akhil Kapur is an Indian actor.

Biography
Kapur was born on 26 August 1985 in Dubai, United Arab Emirates. He is Vinod Khanna's nephew. He made his acting career debut with Desi Kattey in 2014. In 2017, he acted in ALT Balaji's web series Dev DD.

Filmography

Film

Web series

References

External links

Living people
1985 births
Male actors in Hindi cinema